The St. Lawrence Choir is a Canadian mixed-voice choir that performs music from the classical choral repertoire as well as contemporary works by Canadian and other composers. It was founded in 1972.

History
St. Lawrence Choir was formed in 1972 by Iwan Edwards and a group of singers residing in the West Island of Montreal. Concerts were presented in Lachine until 1983 when the Choir relocated to downtown Montreal. Between 1986 and 2009, the Choir regularly appeared with the Montreal Symphony Orchestra as the amateur component of the Montreal Symphony (OSM) chorus, and made numerous recordings with the symphony.  With the OSM, the Choir appeared in Montreal, Toronto, Ottawa, New York, Philadelphia, Saratoga Springs and at the Lanaudière International Music Festival.

In 1992, the Choir was involved in two concerts to mark the 350th anniversary of the founding of Montreal.

On November 1, 1998, the Choir performed with a gala philharmonic orchestra and a number of children's choirs to celebrate the Golden Jubilee of the State of Israel, with proceeds going to the Montreal Children's Hospital Foundation.

In 1999 and 2000, St. Lawrence Choir performed with the OSM and Charles Dutoit at Carnegie Hall and the Lincoln Center to critical acclaim, presenting works by Faure, Dallapiccola, Szymanowski, Orff, de Falla, and Theodorakis.

In 2007-2008 the St. Lawrence Choir was directed by Marika Kuzma during her sabbatical from University of California, Berkeley.
From 2008 to 2013 it was directed by Swiss-born conductor Michael Zaugg, now director of Pro Coro Canada in Edmonton, Alberta.

In 2014, versatile and passionate choral musician,  Philippe Bourque was appointed Artistic Director of the choir and has led the choir on new-concept collaborations.  Philippe Bourque studied choral and orchestral conducting with Julian Wachner, Robert Ingari , Alexis Hauser and Ivars Taurins, and graduated from the McGill University Schulich School of Music with distinction. He is the recipient of a Lieutenant Governor's Award at the Vincent-d'Indy School of Music and is a Fellow of the Social Sciences and Humanities Research Council of Canada.

Since its inception, the St. Lawrence Choir broadcast numerous concerts across Quebec, the rest of Canada and Europe, over the French and English channels of the Canadian Broadcasting Corporation and via Euroradio.

Notable Collaborations

Soloists and Orchestras
The St. Lawrence Choir has worked with excellent soloists and orchestras including:
Baroque ensemble Les Boréades
the McGill Chamber Orchestra
the Ensemble Amati
Victoria de los Ángeles
John Avey, Theodore Baerg
Colette Boky
Benjamin Butterfield
Ben Heppner
Gaëtan Laperierre
Daniel Lichti
Richard Margison
Kevin McMillan
Peter Pears
Gary Relyea
Henriette Schellenberg
Daniel Taylor
Nathaniel Watson.

Notable performances by conductor
The Choir has worked alongside the Montreal Symphony Orchestra to perform classic pieces under their conductors such as:
Franz-Paul Decker conducting Handel's Messiah
Charles Dutoit conducting Mahler's Symphony No. 8, Berlioz's Requiem, Beethoven's Ninth Symphony, Verdi's Requiem, and Dvorak's Stabat Mater
Iwan Edwards conducting Handel's Messiah, Beethoven's Missa Solemnis, Bach's B minor Mass, Mendelssohn's Elijah
Grossman conducting Handel's Messiah
Nicholas McGegan conducting Handel's Messiah
Zubin Mehta conducting Mahler's Symphony No. 2
Penderecki conducting Penderecki's Polish Requiem
 Robert Shaw conducting Beethoven's Missa Solemnis
Leonard Slatkin conducting Mahler's Symphony No. 3

Works by Canadian Composers
The St. Lawrence Choir is proud to have presented works by Canadian composers such as:
Victor Davies
Ruth Watson Henderson
Jacques Hétu
Jean Laplante
Donald Patriquin
Imant Raminsh
Bruce Ruddell
Patrick Wedd
Gilles Tremblay for the premiere of ‘Avec’
Alain Gagnon for the Canadian premiere of ‘Chansons d’Orient’ in 2011
Ivo Antognini for the world premiere of ‘Brink of Eternity’ in 2011

References

External links
 "St. Lawrence Choir". Encyclopedia of Music in Canada
 St. Lawrence Choir History

Musical groups established in 1972
Canadian choirs
Musical groups from Montreal